Derwood E. Williams (August 14, 1889 - April 1973) was an American politician from who served in the Missouri Senate and the Missouri House of Representatives.  He served as prosecuting attorney of Lincoln County, Missouri, from 1919 until 1923.  Williams was educated at Buchanan High School in Troy, Missouri, and the University of Missouri.

References

1889 births
1973 deaths
Democratic Party members of the Missouri House of Representatives
Democratic Party Missouri state senators
20th-century American politicians
People from Lincoln County, Missouri